Top of the Pops magazine was a British monthly publication published by Immediate Media Company. It featured chart information, star gossip, fashion and beauty advice, quizzes, song lyrics and posters. It was a supplementary magazine for the BBC television programme Top of the Pops, which stopped producing weekly shows in 2006. The magazine and TV show diverged and developed distinctive identities.

The magazine was launched in February 1995 and is famous for giving girl group The Spice Girls their nicknames. Alongside a revamp of the TV show, it was originally marketed as the missing link between Smash Hits and NME, but its format was gradually changed, with less music content and a demographic shift to young girls.

The title had several editors over the years, including Peter Loraine, Corinna Shaffer, Rosalie Snaith and Peter Hart.  Contributing editors included Adam Tanswell.

Immediate Media announced the closure of the magazine in October 2022.

References

Monthly magazines published in the United Kingdom
Top of the Pops
BBC publications
Magazines established in 1995
Music magazines published in the United Kingdom
Magazines published in London